Stuyvesant Van Veen (1910–1988) was an American artist and muralist.

Life
Stuyvesant Van Veen was born in NYC, Sept, 12, 1910. He studied at the National Academy of Design and the Art Students League. In 1929 at the age of 19, he became the youngest contributor to an international exhibition of modern paintings at the Carnegie Institute in Pittsburgh. This notoriety led him to be commissioned by the U.S.Treasury Department's Section of Painting and Sculpture to paint "Pittsburgh Panorama" in 1937. The mural hangs in courtroom No. 3 in the U.S. Post Office and Courthouse, downtown Pittsburgh. In the mural, the Westinghouse Bridge frames the city. Decades later, Van Veen, who had leftist beliefs, revealed in an interview that he gave the Monongahela River an especially pointed bend, his subtle way of inserting a sickle into the scene.
In addition to the above, he painted many other murals for the Federal Art Project, including: the Ebbets Field apartments, the New York World's Fair, Wright-Patterson Air Force Base, and Family Court building, Philadelphia.

He taught painting at City College of New York.

References

External links

http://www.mikeettner.com/03/2009/stuyvesant-van-veen/

1910 births
1988 deaths
American muralists
20th-century American artists
Art Students League of New York alumni
City College of New York faculty
Federal Art Project artists
Section of Painting and Sculpture artists